Pafolacianine, sold under the brand name Cytalux, is an optical imaging agent used in fluorescence-guided surgery. Pafolacianine is a fluorescent medication that binds to folate receptor (FR)-expressing cells.

The most common side effects of pafolacianine include infusion-related reactions, including nausea, vomiting, abdominal pain, flushing, dyspepsia, chest discomfort, itching and hypersensitivity.

It was approved for medical use in the United States in November 2021. The U.S. Food and Drug Administration considers it to be a first-in-class medication.

Medical uses 
Pafolacianine is indicated as an adjunct for intraoperative identification of malignant lesions in people with ovarian cancer. It is also indicated to assist identifying lung cancer lesions in adults with known or suspected lung cancer.

History 
The safety and effectiveness of pafolacianine was evaluated in a randomized, multi-center, open-label study of women diagnosed with ovarian cancer or with high clinical suspicion of ovarian cancer who were scheduled to undergo surgery. Of the 134 women (ages 33 to 81 years) who received a dose of pafolacianine and were evaluated under both normal and fluorescent light during surgery, 26.9% had at least one cancerous lesion detected that was not observed by standard visual or tactile inspection.

The safety and effectiveness of pafolacianine was evaluated in a randomized, multicenter, open-label study (NCT04241315) of participants with known or suspected lung cancer who were scheduled to undergo surgery. Of the 110 participants who received a dose of pafolacianine and were evaluated under both normal and fluorescent light during surgery, 24% had at least one cancerous lesion detected that was not observed by standard visual or tactile inspection.

The U.S. Food and Drug Administration (FDA) granted the application for pafolacianine orphan drug, priority review, and fast track designations. The FDA granted the approval of Cytalux to On Target Laboratories, LLC.

Figures

References

External links 
 
 
 

Optical imaging
Orphan drugs
Ovarian cancer
Carboxylic acids
Sulfonic acids
Sulfonates
Pteridines